Guiniella is a genus of spiders in the family Anapidae. It was first described in 2010 by Rix & Harvey. , it contains only one species, Guiniella tropica, found in New Guinea.

References

Anapidae
Monotypic Araneomorphae genera
Spiders of Oceania